Baltimore is an American horror comic book series created by Mike Mignola and Christopher Golden.  The series originally began with an illustrated novel, Baltimore, or, The Steadfast Tin Soldier and the Vampire in 2007. It followed the story of Lord Baltimore's hunt of the vampire Haigus as told by his three friends, Doctor Lemuel Rose, Thomas Childress Jr., and Demetrius Aischros. The series is a part of Mignola and Golden's Outerverse, a shared universe with Joe Golem and other titles such as Lady Baltimore.

Comics
In 2010 Dark Horse Comics began the comic series Baltimore, following Lord Baltimore's hunt for Haigus during the years the original novel skipped over. From the fifth volume onward, the comic's story has moved beyond the events of the original novel.

Baltimore is a series of miniseries, with each miniseries having its own numbering, but each issue also has an ongoing overall numbering on the inside front cover.

Issues

Collected editions
The comic book series has been collected in hardcover volumes. Only the first volume has been published in paperback. The series will be collected in a pair of hardcover omnibuses, the second of includes a new story, Monstrous, written by Mike Mignola and Christopher Golden, art by Ben Stenbeck, colors by Dave Stewart, and lettering by Clem Robins.

Film adaptation
New Regency optioned the rights to adapt Baltimore as a film in September 2007.  The novel's authors wrote a screenplay, while David S. Goyer was set to direct. After a leadership change at New Regency, the studio abandoned the project, and the rights have reverted to the authors.

References

Further reading

External links
 Official website
 Baltimore website at Christopher Golden
 

2007 books
2010 comics debuts
Vampire novels
Novels set during World War I
Comics set during World War I
Alternate history comics
American alternate history novels
World War I alternate histories
Dark Horse Comics limited series
Dark Horse Comics vampires
Characters created by Mike Mignola
Fictional amputees